Vessölandet, also called Vessö is an island situated 10 km to the south of Porvoo in Finland. It has an area of 52 km2 and is the largest island in the region of Eastern Uusimaa. It has a population of 500, of which 400 are Swedish- speaking.

Finnish islands in the Baltic
Porvoo
Islands of Uusimaa